Alwi Farhan (born 12 May 2005) is an Indonesian badminton player. He won the Bronze medal in the Suhandinata Cup 2022 Teams event held in Santander, Spain.

Achievements

BWF International Challenge/Series (1 runners-up) 

Men's singles

  BWF International Challenge tournament
  BWF International Series tournament
  BWF Future Series tournament

BWF Junior International (2 titles, 1 runner-up) 

Boys' singles

  BWF Junior International Grand Prix tournament
  BWF Junior International Challenge tournament
  BWF Junior International Series tournament
  BWF Junior Future Series tournament

Performance timeline

National team 
 Junior level

Individual competitions 
 Junior level

References 

2005 births
Living people
Sportspeople from Central Java
Indonesian male badminton players
21st-century Indonesian people